Wehrenberg Theatres was a movie theater chain in America. It operated 15 movie theaters with 213 screens in the states of Missouri, Illinois, Iowa, Arizona and Minnesota, including nine theaters with 131 screens in the St. Louis metropolitan area. It was a member of the National Association of Theatre Owners. On November 21, 2016 it was announced that the Wehrenberg Theater chain would be acquired by Marcus Theatres. The acquisition was completed in December 2016.

History 
In 1904, Fred Wehrenberg explored the St. Louis World's Fair and saw something that changed his life. The one-time blacksmith who ran a saloon/grocery/butcher shop saw a simple film clip of passengers riding a train while scenery rushed by in the background.

The film inspired Fred to rent the former bakery next to his saloon, buy a piano and 99 kitchen chairs and launch the Cherokee Theatre in 1906. As silent movies flickered on the screen, Fred's nephew drummed in the background while his wife, Gertrude, played piano in the pit.

The saloon doubled as the theater's de facto concession stand, and many customers frequented both buildings. Business boomed, inspiring the Wehrenbergs to open a second venue, the Airdome.

The Airdome was St. Louis’ first open-air venue, basically a drive-in without cars. A screen was erected at one end of a fenced-in lot while an elevated projection booth was built across from it. Guests sat on folding chairs and benches placed on the bare ground. In the winter, a canvas tarp trapped the heat from potbellied stoves to keep guests warm.

The Wehrenbergs survived the Great Depression as the movie industry was more stable than most. Fred paved the way for success by calling on help from his family, and coming into his own as a showman. Fred launched numerous promotions, including giveaways of china, glassware, flatware, turkeys and hams. These innovations ensured circuit success even during the city's lean times.

Business boomed, and soon the Wehrenbergs expanded their theater circuit. They sold their saloon so they could enter the movie industry full-time. They built St. Louis’ Best Theatre, the first building in the city constructed expressly for use as a motion-picture theater.

The Wehrenbergs survived the Great Depression due in part to the stability of the movie industry. Of course, Fred's creativity and mind for promotions helped tremendously. Years before "The Jazz Singer" premiered, Wehrenberg invented its own version of "talking pictures." Local actors scripted dialogue for the silent films, then acted them out behind the screen.

Then, in July 1948, Fred and his son-in-law, Paul Krueger, opened the first Wehrenberg Drive-In. The Drive-In was named "Ronnie's" after six-year-old Ronald Paul Krueger, Paul's son and Fred's grandson. The Ronnie's was the beginning of Ron's lifelong association with the circuit. While still a boy, he ran the miniature train around the playground at Ronnie's Drive-In, entertaining the small children in attendance. Fred debuted another family-friendly idea with pony rides at the 66 Park-In, which Wehrenberg had purchased from Flexer Theatres in April 1948. Grandson Ron was again in charge as he led the pony rides. Ron eventually worked as a carhop, usher and concessionaire before ultimately taking the helm as president of the company.

During the 1950s, the industry hit its first snag. Television and a post-war migration to the suburbs closed several indoor theatres. Fortunately, the Wehrenberg circuit could still ride the popularity of the drive-ins. Paul Krueger, who had taken over management of the circuit upon Fred Wehrenberg's death in 1949, himself died in 1963. It was up to 23-year-old Ron Krueger was left to assume the circuit's presidency and continue with his father's plans. With the help of several loyal, long-time employees, Wehrenberg Theatres made it through the rough spots.

The 1960s and 1970s saw another surge in the industry. Multiplexes, theaters with two to six screens, became the popular choice of movie-goers. Wehrenberg's Cinema Four Center in St. Charles was the first multiplex in the St. Louis area.

In the late 1980s and into the 1990s, the circuit started building megaplexes of ten or more screens.

Wehrenberg also expanded outside the St. Louis area. New theatres opened their doors to guests in Springfield, MO, Osage Beach, MO and Cape Girardeau, MO.

The fourth generation in the family business, Ronald Krueger II, worked for the family business for over 20 years, starting as a theatre usher and projectionist and then advanced through multiple positions in accounting and operations.  He became president of the theatre operating company in 2001 and worked with the team to help expand the circuit and its many innovations.  He left the company in 2008 and became President and COO of New Orleans based VSS-Southern Theatres.

Wehrenberg Theatres’ updates went beyond buildings; they also upgraded by offering guests ticket purchasing via phone, web or theatre ATM machines.

In 2004, Wehrenberg again grew in size and vision with two new theaters. The first, named the Galaxy 16, introduced Iowa to the circuit with its Cedar Rapids location. The second, named the Galaxy 14, is in Chesterfield, MO and boasts St. Louis’ largest screen, the Mega Screen.

Both "Galaxy" locations also are home to "Freds Drive-In," a food court designed like nostalgic 1950s diners, but with current favorites like pizza, chicken fingers and a St. Louis tradition – toasted ravioli. They also feature "Now Playing" Family Entertainment Centers and separate party rooms, perfect for children birthdays.

In 2015 Wehrenberg Theatres was awarded the Director's Community Leadership Award (DCLA) by the Federal Bureau of Investigation. 

Over the years, Wehrenberg Theatres has remained family-owned and operated. Ron Krueger's death on October 21, 2015 has left Bill Menke as President and Midge Krueger as CEO of the company.

On November 21, 2016 it was announced that the Wehrenberg Theater chain would be acquired by Marcus Theatres. The acquisition was completed in December 2016.

Theaters

Greater St. Louis Area
Arnold 14 - Arnold
Mid Rivers 14 - St. Peters
Chesterfield Galaxy 14 - Chesterfield (Features the Mega Screen3D)
O'Fallon 15 - O'Fallon, Illinois
Halls Ferry 8, then 14 - Florissant, Missouri
Des Peres 14 - Des Peres
Ronnies 20 - Sappington (Features IMAX & IMAX 3D)
St. Charles Stadium 18 - St. Charles
St. Clair 10 - Fairview Heights
Town Square 12 - Dardenne Prairie
Shady Oak 1 - Clayton, Missouri
Crown Theatre 1 - Ferguson, Missouri

Missouri
Cape West 14 - Cape Girardeau
Eagles' Landing 8 - Lake Ozark
Campbell 16 - Springfield, Missouri

Illinois
Bloomington Galaxy 14 - Bloomington (Features IMAX & IMAX 3D)

Iowa
Cedar Rapids Galaxy 16 - Cedar Rapids

Minnesota
Rochester Galaxy 14 - Rochester (Features IMAX & IMAX 3D)

External links
Current Marcus page for former Wehrenberg Theatres

References

Companies based in St. Louis
Economy of the Midwestern United States
Former cinemas in the United States
Movie theatre chains in the United States
Entertainment companies established in 1906
1906 establishments in Missouri